Veno may refer to:

People

Given name
 Veno Belk (born 1963), American football player
 Veno Pilon (1896–1970), Slovene painter, graphic artist and photographer
 Veno Taufer (born 1933), Slovenian poet, essayist, translator and playwright

Surname
 Gene Veno, American politician
 William Henry Veno (1866–1933), British chemist

Places
 Venø, Denmark